Adewale James Olufade (born 21 August 1994) is a Togolese international footballer who plays for Union Douala as a left back

Career
He has played club football for AC Merlan, Dynamic Togolais, Panthère du Ndé, AS Togo-Port, New Star de Douala and Union Douala.

He made his international debut for Togo in 2018. In October 2018 the Gambian Football Federation (GFF) complained to the Confederation of African Football (CAF) about Olufade, alleging that he was Nigerian and ineligible to play for Togo; the claims were denied by the Togolese Football Federation. After that complaint was rejected, in February 2019 the GFF confirmed that CAF would hear their appeal. The appeal was rejected, and the original decision was upheld. In March 2019 GFF appealed to the Court of Arbitration for Sport.

References

1994 births
Living people
Togolese footballers
Togo international footballers
AC Merlan players
Dynamic Togolais players
Panthère du Ndé players
AS Togo-Port players
New Star de Douala players
Union Douala players
Association football fullbacks
Togolese expatriate footballers
Togolese expatriate sportspeople in Cameroon
Expatriate footballers in Cameroon
21st-century Togolese people